XHNR-FM is a Spanish & English Top 40 (CHR) language radio station that serves Oaxaca de Juárez and the cities of the Central Valley. It is owned by Organización Radiofónica de Oaxaca, S.A de C.V. and uses the Exa FM name under partnership to MVS Radio.

History
XHNR received its concession on November 23, 1977. It was owned by Miguel Zarate Aquino until 1986, when Márquez Rodríguez bought it.

References

External links 
 EXA 98.5 FM

Contemporary hit radio stations in Mexico
Radio stations in Oaxaca City